Rainbow's or Rainbows End may refer to:

Film
 Rainbow's End (1935 film), a 1935 American Western film
 Rainbow's End (1995 film), a 1995 Australian TV film

Music
 Rainbow's End (album), a 1979 album by Resurrection Band
 Rainbow's End: An Anthology 1973–1985, a 2010 compilation album by Camel
 "Rainbow's End", a song by Amanda Palmer and Edward Ka-Spel from I Can Spin a Rainbow, 2017
 "Rainbow's End", a song by Camel from Breathless, 1978
 "Rainbow's End", a song by Sérgio Mendes from his self-titled album, 1983
 "Rainbows End", a song by Modern English from Ricochet Days, 1984

Other uses
 Rainbow's End, a 1995 novel by Martha Grimes
 Rainbow's End (theme park), an amusement park in Auckland, New Zealand
 Rainbows End, New Zealand, a rural settlement in Auckland, New Zealand
 Rainbows End (novel), a 2006 novel by Vernor Vinge
 "Rainbow's End", a 1978 episode of The Incredible Hulk